The All-Japan Women’s Corporate (Jitsugyodan) Ekiden Championship is held in mid December. The 6 stage 42.195 kilometer ekiden race had been held in Gifu Prefecture from 1983 to 2010. For the December 18, 2011 race, the site was moved to Sendai.

All-Japan Corporate Ekiden Championships
The All-Japan Corporate Ekiden Championships is a series of races contested between Japan's corporate (business) running teams. The structure involves regional qualifying races and a national championship for women and for men. The All-Japan Men's Corporate Ekiden Championship, also called the New Year Ekiden  takes place in Japan's Gunma Prefecture on 1 January.

Qualification Structure
Teams for the women's championship gain qualification into the final ekiden race through a series of 3 preliminaries  (2011 summary). The Eastern Japan Corporate Ekiden Championship qualifies men's and women's teams. Two other qualifying meets for the women are held for Central Japan and Western Japan, (women's divisions detailed in Japanese). The Western Japan women's qualifying race (6 stages, 42.195 km, 31st race on October 23, 2011) begins in Munakata, Fukuoka; website.   After the 3 regional qualifying ekiden events, the field is typically narrowed to 24 to 27 teams, although new qualification standards in 2011 increased the field to include any corporate team that could break the 2:30 mark in one of the regional qualifier meets. Further details and results of the qualification races can be found at All-Japan Corporate Ekiden Championships.

The men have a slightly different pattern (men's divisions detailed in Japanese). One of the men's qualifying races is the Kyushu men's qualifying race (7 stages, 78.8 km, 48th on November 23, 2011), which begins in Fukuoka City and ends in Kita Kyushu city; 2010 video. Other regionals include Kansai Jitsugyodan Ekiden (2010 - 53rd, held in Tabe), Chubu Jitsugyodan Ekiden (2010 - 50th, held in Gero, Gifu), Hokuriku Jitsugyodan Ekiden (2010 - 40th, held in Gero, Gifu), and Chugoku Jitsugyodan Ekiden (2010 - 49th, held in Sera, Hiroshima).

Championship Ekiden Race
The 33 women's teams that qualified for the championship race in mid December, 2011, ran on  the new Sendai course. One of the characteristics of the new course is its uphill nature (video map) with a prevailing headwind.   TBS broadcast homepage, with results (Japanese). English 2008 Results; English 2009 Results; English 2010 Results; English 2011 race preview; English 2011 post race summary. 

Like the men's championship race, participation of foreign team-members is restricted to the shortest stage, in this case the 3.6 km fourth stage; the same rule applied to the second stage on the Gifu course.

Results

References 

Ekiden
Road running competitions in Japan
Sports competitions in Miyagi Prefecture
Sports competitions in Gifu Prefecture
Women's athletics competitions